PML  may refer to:
 Pakistan Muslim League, several Pakistani political parties
 Partido Movimiento Libertario, libertarian political party in Costa Rica
 Plymouth Marine Laboratory, England
 Probable maximum loss, in insurance

In technology
 Programmable Macro Language, for Aveva industrial plant design 
 Provenance Markup Language, for provenance exchange
 Physical Markup Language in XML
 Physical Measurement Laboratory, a US NIST laboratory
 Perfectly matched layer, in wave equations

In medicine
 Polymorphonuclear leucocyte, white blood cell
 Progressive multifocal leukoencephalopathy, rare and usually fatal disorder
 Promyelocytic leukemia protein, tumor suppressor protein

Locations
 Pine Mountain Lake, California, Groveland, US